The descending wedge symbol ∨ may represent:

 Logical disjunction in propositional logic
 Join in lattice theory
 The wedge sum in topology

The vertically reflected symbol, ∧, is a wedge, and often denotes related or dual operators.

The ∨ symbol was introduced by Russell and Whitehead in Principia Mathematica, where they called it the Logical Sum or Disjunctive Function.

In Unicode the symbol is encoded . In TeX, it is \vee or \lor.

One motivation and the most probable explanation for the choice of the symbol ∨ is the latin word "vel" meaning "or" in the inclusive sense. Several authors use "vel" as name of the "or" function.

References

See also
List of mathematical symbols
List of logic symbols

Logic symbols